Yagra is a village and township in the Tibet Autonomous Region of China, not far from the base of the sacred  Mount Kailash. The Bukhar, one of the upper tributaries of the Indus River, begins near Yagra and is fed by snowmelt.

Notes

References
Albinia, Alice. (2008) Empires of the Indus: The Story of a River. First American Edition (2010) W. W. Norton & Company, New York. .

See also
List of towns and villages in Tibet

Populated places in Shigatse
Township-level divisions of Tibet
Zhongba County